Giuliano Illiani (born 11 September 1947), best known as Donatello, is an Italian singer, mainly successful in the first half of the 1970s.

Background 
Born in Tortona, Illiani started his musical career as a member of the band Wanted’s between 1962 and 1966. In 1968 he became guitarist in the  Gianni Morandi's backing band. 

In 1970 Illiani adopted the stage name Donatello and entered the competition at the Sanremo Music Festival with the song "Io mi fermo qui",  presented in a double performance with the band  Dik Dik. The same year Donatello got his first commercial success with the song "Malattia d'amore" which charted tenth on the Italian hit parade. 

Between 1971 and 1973 he entered the main competition at the Sanremo Music Festival three more times, always being a finalist. In the same years he got two top ten hits with the songs "Com'è dolce la sera" and "Ti voglio". After the 1974 single "Irene", which he presented at Un disco per l'estate, Donatello left Dischi Ricordi and started pursuing a more personal musical path, characterized by the recovery of traditional  sounds.

Discography
Album 
     1970 - Donatello  
     1975 - Il tempo degli dei  
     1978 - A mio nonno ambulante  
 
Singles 
 1970 - Io mi fermo qui 
 1970 - 100 volte lei 
  1970 - Malattia d'amore 
 1970 - Tu giovane amore mio 
 1971 - Com'è dolce la sera 
 1971 - Alice è cambiata 
 1971 - Anima mia 
 1972 - Ti voglio 
 1972 - Gira gira sole 
 1974 - Irene 
 1975 - Uomo di città 
 1976 - Un uomo in più

References

External links
 
 

 
1947 births
People from Tortona
Italian pop singers
Italian folk singers
Italian male singers
Living people